Wheel construction refers to the making of wheels. Construction of wire-spoked wheels is generally termed as wheelbuilding, so wheel construction refers to construction of non-wire wheels, e.g. wheels of cars and other heavier vehicles. Wheels are constructed in a wide variety of designs using different materials, but in the early 21st century, aluminum and steel are most often used, with steel-made wheels being heavier and more durable than aluminum wheels. The performance of a wheel depends on the alloy and technique used to construct it. A wheel is usually made up of a rim, which connects with the tire, and a central disc, also known as the disc or spider, which connects the wheel to the vehicle. Wheels are usually of two types: semi-drop center (SDC), used in trucks, and drop center (DC), used in other vehicles.

History of wheel construction
The wheel is one of the most important inventions, but its inventor and exact date of invention are not yet known. The oldest known wheel was excavated from Mesopotamia, believed to be 5500 years old. This earliest wheel was a potter's wheel, used in the city of Ur in Mesopotamia (present-day Iraq), invented by Mesopotamians (also known as Sumerians) around 3500 BCE. The earliest known use of the wheel for transportation is in Mesopotamian chariots about 3200 years ago. Egyptians developed wheels with spokes about 2000 years ago, followed by Europeans some 1400 years ago. Another source says the oldest wheel used for transportation, with a radius of 27.5 inches (70 centimeters), was discovered in 2002, about 12.5 miles (20 kilometres) south west of Ljubljana in Slovenia, and is believed to be 5200 years old.

Methods of single-piece wheel construction
Most wheels are single-piece wheels, made using casting, forging, rim rolling and/or high light methods.

Casting
In casting, wheels are made by using a mold. The mold is filled with molten metal; as the metal cools, the wheel becomes strong and rigid. Various types of casting processes result in wheels with different properties. Gravity casting and low-pressure casting are common types of casting.

Gravity casting
In gravity casting, metal is poured into a mold and gravity alone causes the molten metal to fill the mold. This method is simple and low-cost, but aluminum cast this way will not be as dense as with other casting methods. Wheels constructed by this method are therefore made slightly heavier to achieve equivalent strength.

Low-pressure casting
In this method, molten aluminum is pumped into molds at heightened speed, which increases pressure and prevents formation of bubbles. Low-pressure casting is most common type of wheel casting because of the strength and quality of wheels formed by this method.

Forging
The forging method is considered best for making single-piece wheels because the wheels made using this method are both lightweight and strong. In this method, a stronger and denser wheel is produced by shaping an aluminum billet under high heat and at about 900 bars of pressure.

Rim-rolling
In this method, simple casting and a special rolling machine are used to construct wheels. The desired wheel is molded by heating its outer portion, with pressure provided by spinning the unfinished wheel, and sculpting the wheel using specialized rollers. This method creates a wheel similar in quality to forged wheels, but at a lower cost. OEM (original equipment manufacturing) wheels constructed by this method are used in special performance vehicles.

High light technology
This method is used to construct light wheels of racing vehicles. In this method, the material is compressed using rollers along a low-pressure aluminum barrel, which gives it its required shape and form.

Methods of multi-piece wheel construction
Two- or three-piece wheels, also known as multi-piece wheels, are assembled from pieces constructed separately by the methods mentioned above. Bolts or welding, or both, can be used to assemble the separate parts of such wheels.

References 

Wheels